Matthew Rosslee (born 24 February 1987) is a South African rugby union footballer. His regular playing position is inside-centre. He represented the Griquas in the Currie Cup and Vodacom Cup. He previously played for Western Province and played in the Varsity Cup for the Ikey Tigers. He currently plays his rugby in Hong Kong and has signed a playing contract with the Hong Kong Rugby Football Union. He made his debut for Hong Kong against Kenya in August 2016, and played in the 2016 Cup of Nations.

He is the playing captain of Societe Generale Valley Rugby Football Club. The club won the Grand Championships in the 2014/2015 and 2015/2016 playing seasons under his captaincy. He has previously been involved with the Cheetahs Super Rugby squad, the SA Premier XV (2011), SA Students XV (2009), SA Students 7's who won the 2008 Student World Cup 7's in Spain.

External links 

itsrugby.co.uk profile

Living people
1987 births
South African rugby union players
Rugby union centres
Rugby union players from Cape Town
Griquas (rugby union) players
Western Province (rugby union) players
University of Cape Town alumni
South African people of British descent
White South African people